Novorossiya, literally "New Russia", is a historical name, used during the era of the Russian Empire for an administrative area that would later become the southern mainland of Ukraine: the region immediately north of the Black Sea and Crimea. The province fell largely within a slightly wider area known in Ukrainian as the Stepovyna "Steppe Land", or Nyz "Lower Land". The name Novorossiya entered official usage in 1764, after the Russian Empire conquered the Crimean Khanate, and annexed its territories, when Novorossiya Governorate (or Province) was founded. Official usage of the name ceased after 1917, when the entire area was incorporated in the Ukrainian People's Republic (precursor of the Ukrainian SSR).

Novorossiya Governorate was formed (1764) from military frontier regions and parts of the southern Hetmanate, in anticipation of a war with the Ottoman Empire. It was further expanded by the annexation of the Zaporozhian Sich in 1775. At various times, Novorossiya encompassed the Moldavian region of Bessarabia, the modern Ukraine's regions of the Black Sea littoral (Prychornomoria), Zaporizhzhia, Tavria, the Azov Sea littoral (Pryazovia), the Tatar region of Crimea, the area around the Kuban River, and the Circassian lands. The governorate was dissolved in 1783, but reestablished from 1796.

The region remained part of the Russian Empire until its collapse following the Russian February Revolution in early March 1917, after which it became part of the short-lived Russian Republic. In 1918, it was largely included in the Ukrainian State and in the Ukrainian Soviet Republic at the same time. In 1918–1920, it was, to varying extents, under the control of the anti-Bolshevik White movement governments of South Russia whose defeat signified the Soviet control over the territory, which became part of the Ukrainian Soviet Socialist Republic, within the Soviet Union in 1922.

History

The modern history of the region follows the fall of the Golden Horde. The eastern portion was claimed by the Crimean Khanate (one of its multiple successors), while its western regions were divided between Moldavia and Lithuania. With the expansion of the Ottoman Empire, the whole Black Sea northern littoral region came under the control of the Crimean Khanate that in turn became a vassal of the Ottomans. Sometime in the 16th century the Crimean Khanate allowed the Nogai Horde which were displaced from its native Volga region by Muscovites and Kalmyks to settle in the Black Sea steppes.

Vast regions to the North of the Black Sea were sparsely populated and were known as the Wild Fields (as translated from Polish or Ukrainian), Dykra (in Lithuanian) or Loca deserta ("desolated places") in Latin on medieval maps. There were, however, many settlements along the Dnieper River. The Wild Fields had covered roughly the southern territories of modern Ukraine; some say they extended into the modern Southern Russia (Rostov Oblast).

The Russian Empire gradually gained control over the area, signing peace treaties with the Cossack Hetmanate and with the Ottoman Empire at the conclusion of the Russo-Turkish Wars of 1735–39, 1768–74, 1787–92 and 1806–12. In 1764 the Russian Empire established the Novorossiysk Governorate; it was originally to be named after the Empress Catherine, but she decreed that it should be called New Russia instead. Its administrative centre was at St. Elizabeth fortress (today, Kropyvnytskyi) in order to protect the southern borderlands from the Ottoman Empire, and in 1765 this passed to Kremenchuk.

The rulers of Novorossiya gave out land generously to the Russian nobility (dvoryanstvo) and the enserfed peasantry—mostly from Ukraine and fewer from Russia—to encourage immigration for the cultivation of the then sparsely populated steppe. According to the Historical Dictionary of Ukraine:

There was an initial endeavour to colonize the region with several ethnic groups, of which the most numerous were Romanians and Ruthenians (Ukrainians). East of the Southern Bug river, in the region formerly called New Serbia, in 1757 the largest ethnic group were Romanians at 75%, followed by Serbs at 12% and 13% others.

After the annexation of the Ottoman territories to Novorossiya in 1774, the Russian authorities commenced a broad program of colonization, encouraging large migrations from a broader spectrum of ethnic groups. Catherine the Great invited European settlers to these newly conquered lands: Romanians (from Moldavia, Wallachia and Transylvania), Bulgarians, Serbs, Greeks, Albanians, Germans, Poles, Italians, and others.

In 1775, the Russian Empress Catherine the Great forcefully liquidated the Zaporizhian Sich and annexed its territory to Novorossiya, thus eliminating the independent rule of the Ukrainian Cossacks. Prince Grigori Potemkin (1739–1791) directed the Russian colonization of the land at the end of 18th century. Catherine the Great granted him the powers of an absolute ruler over the area from 1774.

The spirit and importance of New Russia at this time is aptly captured by the historian Willard Sunderland,

In 1792, the Russian government declared that the region between the Dniester and the Bug was to become a new principality named "New Moldavia", under Russian suzerainty. According to the first Russian census of the Yedisan region conducted in 1793 (after the expulsion of the Nogai Tatars) 49 villages out of 67 between the Dniester and the Southern Bug were Romanian.

From 1796 to 1802 Novorossiya was the name of the Governorate with the capital Novorossiysk (previously and subsequently Ekaterinoslav, the present-day Ukrainian city of Dnipropetrovsk not to be confused with present-day Novorossiysk, Russian Federation) In 1802 it was divided into three governorates, the Yekaterinoslav, Kherson, and the Taurida.

From 1822 to 1874 the Novorossiysk-Bessarabia General Government was centred in Odesa.

Demographics

Ethnicity
The ethnic composition of Novorossiya changed during the beginning of the 19th century due to the intensive movement of colonists who rapidly created towns, villages, and agricultural colonies. During the Russo-Turkish Wars, the major Turkish fortresses of Ozu-Cale, Akkerman, Khadzhibey, Kinburn and many others were conquered and destroyed. New cities and settlements were established in their places. Over time the ethnic composition varied.

Multiple ethnicities participated in the founding of the cities of Novorossiya (most of these cities were expansions of older settlements). For example:

 Zaporizhzhia as formerly the site of a Cossack fort
 Odesa, founded in 1794 on the site of a Tatar village (the first recorded mention of a settlement located in current Odesa was in 1415) by a Spanish general in Russian service, Jose de Ribas, had a French mayor, Richelieu (in office 1803–1814)
 Donetsk, founded in 1869, was originally named Yuzovka (Yuzivka) in honor of John Hughes, the Welsh industrialist who developed the coal region of the Donbas

According to the report of governor Shmidt, the ethnic composition of Kherson Governorate and the city of Odesa in 1851 was as follows:

Language
With regard to language usage, Russian was commonly spoken in the cities and some outside areas, while Ukrainian generally predominated in rural areas, smaller towns, and villages.

The 1897 All-Russian Empire Census statistics show that Ukrainian was the native language spoken by most of the population of Novorossiya, but with Russian and Yiddish languages dominating in most city areas.

The 1897 All-Russian Empire Census statistics:

List of founded cities
Many of the cities that were founded (most of these cities were expansions of older settlements) during the imperial period are major cities today.

Imperial Russian regiments were used to build these cities, at the expense of hundreds of soldiers’ lives.

First wave
 Yelisavetgrad (Kropyvnytskyi) (1754)
 Aleksandrovsk (Zaporizhzhia) (1770)
 Yekaterinoslav (Dnipro) (1776)
 Kherson (1778)
 Mariupol (1778)
 Sevastopol (1783)
 Simferopol (1784)
 Melitopol (1784)
 Pavlohrad (1784)

Second wave
 Nikolaev (Mykolaiv) (1789)
 Tiraspol (1792)
 Odesa (1794)
 Yekaterinodar (Krasnodar) (1794)

Third wave
 Berdyansk (1827)
 Novorossiysk (1838)

Legacy

Following the Soviet Union's collapse on 26 December 1991 and concurrent with the lead-up to Ukrainian independence on 24 August 1991, a nascent movement began in Odesa for the restoration of Novorossiya region; it however failed within days and never defined its borders. The initial conception had not developed exact borders, but focus centred on the Odesa, Mykolaiv, Kherson, and Crimean oblasts, with eventually other oblasts joining as well.

The name received renewed emphasis when Russian President Vladimir Putin stated in an interview on 17 April 2014 that the territories of Kharkiv, Luhansk, Donetsk, Kherson, Mykolaiv and Odesa were part of what was called Novorossiya. In May 2014, the self-proclaimed Donetsk People's Republic and Luhansk People's Republic proclaimed the confederation of Novorossiya and its desire to extend its control towards all of southeastern Ukraine. The confederation had little practical unity and within a year the project was abandoned: on 1 January 2015 the founding leadership announced the project had been put on hold, and on 20 May the constituent members announced the freezing of the political project.

See also

 Battle of Kherson 2022
 Russian occupation of Kherson Oblast 2022
 Donetsk–Krivoy Rog Soviet Republic
 Novorossiya (confederation)
 Great Russia
 Little Russia
 New Serbia
 Russian irredentism
 Slavo-Serbia
 Southern Ukraine
 Territorial evolution of Russia
 White Russia

Notes

References

External links

Map of Novorossiya (New Russia)
Novorossiya leaders and Odessa mayors

 
Historical regions in Ukraine
Historical regions in Russia
Zaporizhzhia (region)
Russians in Ukraine
Russification